Andrei Dmitrievich Simonov (born 29 June 1966) is a Russian Armed Forces major general (one-star rank) serving as Chief of the Electronic Warfare Troops of the 2nd Army of the Western Military District. On April 30th, 2022, the Armed Forces of Ukraine claimed to have killed Simonov in an artillery strike. His death has yet to been confirmed by Russian officials.

Biography
Andrei Dmitrievich Simonov was born on 29, June 1966, in Baranovka, Verkhnekamsky District, Kirov Oblast. In 1987, he graduated from the Tomsk Higher Military Command School of Communications and began his service in the Electronic Warfare troops. Here he worked as an operational duty officer, a platoon commander, a command post leader, and a deputy battalion commander. 

In 2000 he graduated from the Frunze Military Academy, and was promoted from a senior officer of the Siberian Military District's electronic warfare service to head of the Vostok regional command headquarters' electronic warfare service. In 2010, he graduated from the General Staff Academy and was appointed Chief of the Electronic Security Service of the Western Military District of the Russian Federation. By 2011, he had been promoted to the rank of colonel. Since 2014, he has been Deputy Chief of the Electronic Warfare Troops of the Russian Armed Forces.

Simonov was promoted to major general in 2016.

Alleged Death 
Major General Andrei Simonov was reported as killed in a Grad missile artillery strike carried out by the Armed Forces of Ukraine on 30 April 2022, during the larger 2022 Russian invasion of Ukraine. This strike was allegedly carried out against a field command post of the Russian 2nd Army near Izium, during the Battle of Donbas. News of the Major General's death was first reported by the Kyiv Post when Ukrainian Presidential military adviser Oleksiy Arestovych claimed in an interview the attack had killed Simonov, approximately 100 Russian troops, and destroyed 30 armoured vehicles. Ukrainian politician Anton Gerashchenko would affirm Simonov's death in a Telegram post. Russia has not yet confirmed Simonov's death.

The Times of Israel and the New York Times have reported that the artillery strike was not intended to target Simonov but rather General Valery Gerasimov, who was present at the command post not long before the attack. Intel of Gerasimov's location was believed to have been provided by the United States and the intention of the attack was confirmed by anonymous United States officials.

Awards 

 Medal "For Valor" Ist degree

Works 

 Perspective Control System for Electronic Warfare Forces -The Basis for Realizing the Combat Capabilities of Different Forces and Equipment. 

See also 
 List of Russian generals killed during the 2022 invasion of Ukraine

References

External Links 

 Perspective Control System for Electronic Warfare Forces -The Basis for Realizing the Combat Capabilities of Different Forces and Equipment.

1966 births
Russian major generals
Eastern Ukraine offensive
People from Kirov Oblast
Russian military personnel of the 2022 Russian invasion of Ukraine
Frunze Military Academy alumni
Military Academy of the General Staff of the Armed Forces of Russia alumni